1808 was the 22nd season of cricket in England since the foundation of Marylebone Cricket Club (MCC). George Osbaldeston made his debut in important matches.

Honours
 Most runs – Lord Frederick Beauclerk 379 (HS 100)
 Most wickets – Thomas Howard and Lord Frederick Beauclerk 16 apiece

Events
 With the Napoleonic War continuing, loss of investment and manpower impacted cricket and only 6 first-class matches have been recorded in 1808:
 23–24 May: MCC v Middlesex @ Lord's Old Ground
 30–31 May: MCC v Middlesex @ Lord's Old Ground
 6–7 June: MCC v Homerton @ Lord's Old Ground
 27–29 June: All-England v Surrey @ Lord's Old Ground
 6–7 July: All-England v Surrey @ Lord's Old Ground
 11–13 July: Surrey v All-England @ Holt Pound, Farnham

Debutants
1808 debutants included:
 William Ashby (Kent)
 Benjamin Aislabie (MCC)
 Douglas Kinnaird (MCC)
 George Osbaldeston (MCC)

References

Bibliography

Further reading
 
 
 
 
 

1808 in English cricket
English cricket seasons in the 19th century